Dr. John Christie Ware Bungalow, is located in Saddle River, Bergen County, New Jersey, United States. The house was built in 1919 and was added to the National Register of Historic Places on August 29, 1986.

See also
National Register of Historic Places listings in Bergen County, New Jersey

References

Houses on the National Register of Historic Places in New Jersey
Houses completed in 1909
Houses in Bergen County, New Jersey
National Register of Historic Places in Bergen County, New Jersey
Saddle River, New Jersey
New Jersey Register of Historic Places